Anna Odine Strøm (born 17 April 1998) is a Norwegian ski jumper. She was born in Alta. She has represented Norway at FIS Nordic World Ski Championships four times (in 2015, 2019, 2021, and 2023).

References

External links
 
 

1998 births
Living people
People from Alta, Norway
Norwegian female ski jumpers
Ski jumpers at the 2016 Winter Youth Olympics
FIS Nordic World Ski Championships medalists in ski jumping
Ski jumpers at the 2022 Winter Olympics
Olympic ski jumpers of Norway
Sportspeople from Troms og Finnmark
21st-century Norwegian women